The Daily Gazetteer was an English newspaper which was published from 30 June 1735 until 1746.  The paper was printed for T. Cooper, at the Globe in Pater-Noster Row, London by W. Arnall et al.

The Gazetteer and New Daily Advertiser was printed by Charles Say until his death in 1775, after which it was printed by his widow, Mary Say.

The paper was then published as 
 The Daily Gazetteer or London Advertiser from 1746 until 15 April 1748
 The London Gazetteer from 5 December 1748 until October 1753
 The Gazetteer and London Daily Advertiser from 1 November 1753 until April 1764
 The Gazetteer and New Daily Advertiser 27 from April 1764 until November 1796
 The Gazetteer from November 1796 until September 1797

See also 
 Burney Collection of Newspapers

References

Defunct newspapers published in the United Kingdom
Publications established in 1735
1735 establishments in England